Jayasuriya Arachchige Dona Mary Yvonne Perera, better known as Sandhya Kumari (born 6 January 1945 – died 2 June 1994) was a popular Sri Lankan actress who frequently played femme fatale roles in early Sinhala cinema.

Personal life
She was born on 6 January 1945 in Colombo. Kumari was married to Upali Perera.

Career
Kumari's first film role was in the 1963 film Adata Wadiya Heta Hondai. Starring alongside Gamini Fonseka, Jeevarani Kurukulasooriya, Ananda Jayaratne, Nelson Karunagama and Vijitha Mallika, Kumari gained fame with the performance. She then appeared as the heroine in the tale of fisher folk, Dheewarayo, released in 1964. In 1965, she acted in Allapu Gedera.

Her other films include Patachara,Ipadunay Aiye?, Ran Rasa, Sura Chowraya (1967), Akka Nago, Amathikama, Ataweni Pudumaya, Bicycle Hora, Hangi Hora, Pini Bindu (1968), Kawda Hari, Sooraygeth Sooraya (1969; which featured a fight sequence between her and Sonia Dissanayake) and Sakuntala (1977).

Filmography

References

External links
Sandhya Kumari's Biography in Sinhala Cinema Database

1945 births
1994 deaths
Sri Lankan film actresses
20th-century Sri Lankan actresses